Li Guangquan (born 19 September 1960) is a Chinese alpine skier. He competed in two events at the 1984 Winter Olympics.

References

1960 births
Living people
Chinese male alpine skiers
Olympic alpine skiers of China
Alpine skiers at the 1984 Winter Olympics
Skiers from Heilongjiang
20th-century Chinese people